Karl Lovell is a New Zealand former professional rugby league footballer who played for the Parramatta Eels, Northern Eagles and the Cronulla-Sutherland Sharks in the NRL between 1997 and 2002. He played for the Budgewoi Bulldogs and the Toukley Hawks as a junior. Throughout this he also played for the Sheffield Eagles and the joint Sheffield and Huddersfield merger side in the Super League between 1999 and 2000.

Playing career
Lovell made his first grade debut for Parramatta in Round 1 1997 against North Sydney. Lovell played in both finals games for the club in the same year against Newcastle and Norths which ended in defeat. This was the first time since 1986 that the club had qualified for the finals.

In 1998, Parramatta finished 4th and Lovell was a regular starter in the team. Lovell played in all 3 finals games for the club including wins against Norths and eventual premiers Brisbane and the heartbreaking preliminary final loss to arch rivals Canterbury.

With Parramatta leading 18–2 with less than 10 minutes to play, Canterbury staged a comeback scoring 3 tries in 8 minutes with Canterbury player Daryl Halligan kicking 2 goals from the sideline to tie the game at 18-18. Parramatta player Paul Carige then made a series of personal errors which cost Parramatta dearly in extra time with Canterbury going on to win 32–20. The game is often referred to as one of the biggest preliminary final chokes of all time and this would be Lovell's last match for the club.

Lovell then moved to England and played with Huddersfield-Sheffield before returning to Australia in 2001 to play with the now defunct Northern Eagles. Lovell finished his career with Cronulla-Sutherland and his last game in first grade was the 2002 preliminary final loss against the New Zealand Warriors.

References

1977 births
Living people
Cronulla-Sutherland Sharks players
Huddersfield Giants players
New Zealand rugby league players
Northern Eagles players
Parramatta Eels players
Rugby league centres
Rugby league props
Rugby league second-rows
Sheffield Eagles (1984) players
Rugby league players from Auckland
Sportsmen from New South Wales